Hansemann Mountains is a mountain range in Papua New Guinea. It was named after Adolph von Hansemann.
Hansemann Mountains are located near town of Madang.

See also
Hansemann Range languages

References

Mountain ranges of Papua New Guinea